

Key

Head coaches
Statistics correct as of the end of the 2022 college football season.

Notes

References

Lists of college football head coaches

Pennsylvania sports-related lists